Fair Play Award may refer to:

Association football
Kategoria Superiore Fair Play Award, in Albania
FIFA Fair Play Award
MLS Fair Play Award
North American Soccer League Fair Play Award

Other
Indian Premier League Fair Play Award
Giro d'Italia#Minor classifications

See also

Fair Play Trophy (disambiguation)